Escape in the Desert is a 1945 American drama film directed by Edward A. Blatt and written by Marvin Borowsky and Thomas Job. The film stars Jean Sullivan, Philip Dorn, Irene Manning, Helmut Dantine, Alan Hale, Sr. and Samuel S. Hinds. The film was released by Warner Bros. on May 1, 1945. The opening credits say that Escape in the Desert is adapted “from a play by Robert E Sherwood” without identifying the work: The Petrified Forest. Warner Bros. had adapted Sherwood's play for the screen in 1936.

Plot
The action takes place in the southwestern United States late in World War II. Four POWs from Nazi Germany escape American custody and eventually wind up taking over a small gas station/hotel in the desert. They plan to obtain a fueled-up vehicle and flee the country. A Dutch military pilot traveling through America, on his way to fight in the Pacific, is initially mistaken by some locals as one of the Nazis. Eventually, however, he helps lead the resistance against the Germans.

Cast 
 Jean Sullivan as Jane
 Philip Dorn as Philip Artveld
 Irene Manning as Lora Tedder
 Helmut Dantine as Capt. Becker
 Alan Hale, Sr. as Dr. Orville Tedder
 Samuel S. Hinds as Gramp
 Bill Kennedy as Hank Albright
 Kurt Kreuger as Lt. Von Kleist
 Rudolph Anders as Hoffman
 Hans Schumm as Klaus
 Blayney Lewis as Danny

Reception 
In his May 12, 1945 review, New York Times critic Bosley Crowther compared the film unfavorably with its predecessor:“Aside from the Arizona locale and a few vague theatrical landmarks, there is nothing about this picture to remind you of the play or previous film. The original found dramatic conflict between a notorious gangster "on the lam" and a disillusioned intellectual who was a veteran of the first World War. The present film sets a young Dutch flier who is hitch-hiking across the United States against a band of Nazi soldiers who have escaped from a desert prison camp. And whereas the former had something of depth and perception to it, the present is just a melodrama of the sock-and-bust-'em school. Perhaps that is all the Warners ever meant that it should be… only Samuel S. Hinds as a genial "sourdough" has real attractiveness. The climax finds the Nazis shooting it out with a sheriff's posse in Western style. But that only serves to clinch the genre of the picture, which is suspected from the start.”

References

External links 
 

1945 films
1940s thriller drama films
American black-and-white films
American thriller drama films
Films scored by Adolph Deutsch
Films set in hotels
Films set on the home front during World War II
Warner Bros. films
World War II spy films
1945 drama films
1940s English-language films
1940s American films